Michael C. Conway is an American football coach. He is the defensive coordinator at Lindenwood University – Belleville in Belleville, Illinois, a position he had held since 2019. Conway served as the head football coach at Olivet Nazarene University in Bourbonnais, Illinois from 1996 to 1999 and North Park University in Chicago, Illinois from 2013 to 2018. In the fourth game his first season at North Park, in 2013, he led his team to victory in a game against |0|7|1|9}}. This win ended a 13-year, 89-game losing streak in College Conference of Illinois and Wisconsin (CCIW) play. In 2002, Conway was announced as the head coach of the Southwestern Moundbuilders in Winfield, Kansas to replace head coach Monty Lewis. However, he never coached a game for the school.

Head coaching record

Football

References

External links
 Lindenwood–Belleville profile
 North Park profile

Year of birth missing (living people)
Living people
American football offensive linemen
Arkansas State Red Wolves football coaches
Lindenwood–Belleville Lynx football coaches
California Vulcans football coaches
Geneva Golden Tornadoes football coaches
North Park Vikings football coaches
Purdue Boilermakers football coaches
Olivet Nazarene Tigers football coaches
Olivet Nazarene Tigers football players
Washington & Jefferson Presidents baseball coaches
Washington & Jefferson Presidents football coaches